Lincklaen is a town in Chenango County, New York, United States. The population was 396 at the 2010 census. The town was named after Colonel John Lincklaen, an agent of the Holland Land Company and a land owner. The town is in the northwestern corner of the county, northwest of the city Norwich and northeast of Cortland (in Cortland County).

History 

The land was first settled circa 1796. Lincklaen was formed from the town of German in 1823. Parts of the town were removed to form the town of Pitcher in 1827 and 1833.

The 1865 population was 988.

Geography

The northern town line is the border of Madison County, and the western town line is the border of Cortland County.

Mud Creek is an important stream flowing southward through the town. Via the Otselic, then the Tioughnioga, then the Chenango River, it is part of the watershed of the Susquehanna River flowing to Chesapeake Bay.

Demographics

As of the census of 2000, there were 416 people, 153 households, and 113 families residing in the town.  The population density was 15.8 people per square mile (6.1/km2).  There were 243 housing units at an average density of 9.2 per square mile (3.6/km2).  The racial makeup of the town was 97.12% White, 0.72% African American, 0.72% Native American, 0.24% Asian, 0.72% from other races, and 0.48% from two or more races. Hispanic or Latino of any race were 0.96% of the population.

There were 153 households, out of which 34.6% had children under the age of 18 living with them, 57.5% were married couples living together, 10.5% had a female householder with no husband present, and 25.5% were non-families. 20.3% of all households were made up of individuals, and 8.5% had someone living alone who was 65 years of age or older.  The average household size was 2.72 and the average family size was 3.03.

In the town, the population was spread out, with 26.0% under the age of 18, 8.2% from 18 to 24, 28.1% from 25 to 44, 26.4% from 45 to 64, and 11.3% who were 65 years of age or older.  The median age was 37 years. For every 100 females, there were 110.1 males.  For every 100 females age 18 and over, there were 106.7 males.

The median income for a household in the town was $30,588, and the median income for a family was $35,750. Males had a median income of $23,750 versus $20,556 for females. The per capita income for the town was $15,030.  About 12.8% of families and 17.0% of the population were below the poverty line, including 23.5% of those under age 18 and 8.9% of those age 65 or over.

Communities and locations in Lincklaen 
Burdick Settlement – A former community in the northern part of the town.
Lincklaen – The hamlet of Lincklaen is by the western town line, located on Mud Creek and County Road 12.
Lincklaen Center – A hamlet northeast of Lincklaen village, located on Mud Creek.
Mariposa – A hamlet east of Lincklaen Center, near the eastern town line on County Road 13.
Rhode Island – A hamlet at the eastern town line on County Road 13.

References

External links
 Town of Lincklaen official website
  DeRuyter Central School District
  Early history of Lincklaen, NY

Towns in Chenango County, New York